Municipal elections were held in the Czech Republic on 1 and 2 November 1998. The Civic Democratic Party received the most votes, although the Christian and Democratic Union – Czechoslovak People's Party won more seats.

Results

References

2002
Municipal elections
Czech municipal elections